The Board of Intermediate and Secondary Education, Dinajpur, Bangladesh an autonomous organization, mainly responsible for holding three public examinations (Junior School Certificate (JSC), Secondary School Certificate (SSC), and Higher Secondary (School) Certificate (HSC)) and for providing recognition to the newly established non-government educational institutions and also for the supervision, control and developments of those institutions. It started the operation in 2006. Before that, this education board was within Rajshahi Education Board.

Districts under Dinajpur Education Board

 Dinajpur
 Gaibandha
 Kurigram
 Lalmonirhat
 Nilphamari
 Panchagarh
Rangpur
 Thakurgaon.

See also
 List of Education Boards in Bangladesh

References

External links
 Official Website
 Education Boards of Bangladesh
 Directorate of Secondary and Higher Education in Bangladesh

Education in Rangpur, Bangladesh
Education Board in Bangladesh
Government boards of Bangladesh